Bertold may refer to:

Given name
Bertold Brühaven, Teutonic knight from the then Duchy of Austria, Komtur of Königsberg from 1289 to 1302
Bertold Eisner (1875–1956), Croatian Jewish law professor at the University of Zagreb
Bertold Hummel (1925–2002), German composer of modern classical music
Bertold Löffler (1874–1960), Austrian painter, printmaker, and designer
Bertold Mainka (born 1934), Polish rower
Bertold Popovics (born 1991), Hungarian midfielder
Bertold Posselt, Austrian luger who competed in the early 1910s
Bertold of Regensburg (1220–1272), German preacher during the high Middle Ages
Bertold Reissig (born 1877), German stage and film actor
Bertold Wiesner FRSE (1901–1972), Austrian Jewish physiologist

Surname
Isabella Bertold (born 1991), Canadian sailor and cyclist

See also
Berthold (disambiguation)
Bertholds (disambiguation)
Bertol (disambiguation)
Bertoldi
Bertoldo